Stalheim is a village in the municipality Voss in Vestland county, Norway.  The small village lies along the European route E16 highway in the northeastern part of the municipality.  The village sits at a high point in the inner part of the Nærøydalen valley which leads northeastwards towards the Nærøyfjorden. The highway runs through a series of tunnels to descend into the valley; in 2021 authorities said that the old road Stalheimskleivi will be closed for cars and buses forever; the road has hairpin turns and 20% grade.

The Stalheimsfossen waterfall is the most notable sight in the area.  The view from Stalheim is well known from several paintings, in particular Johan Christian Dahl's painting Fra Stalheim from 1842.   Sivlesteinen, a memorial of the poet Per Sivle, was raised by Noregs Ungdomslag and other organizations at Stalheim in 1909.

History
In 1943 Lebensborn activity took over the use of Stalheim Hotel.

Media gallery

References

Voss
Villages in Vestland